Özgen is a Turkish surname. Notable people with the surname include:

 Abdulkadir Özgen (born 1986), Turkish-German footballer
 Pemra Özgen (born 1986), Turkish tennis player
 Tolga Özgen (born 1980), Turkish footballer

a
Turkish-language surnames

Ibrahim ozgen born 1996